The Arab League 22nd Summit was held in Sirte, in Libya on 27 March 2010.

Italian prime minister Silvio Berlusconi spoke at the summit, stressing that Israel should return the Golan Heights to Syria.

Palestinian President Mahmoud Abbas rejected pressure from Syria and Libya to quit the peace process.  His senior aide Nabil Abu Rdeneh said: "We are ready for any Arab option. If they want to go to war let them declare that and mobilize their armies and their people and we will follow suit."

External links
Official website

References

2010
2010 in Libya
21st-century diplomatic conferences (MENA)
2010 in international relations
2010 conferences
Diplomatic conferences in Libya
Sirte
March 2010 events in Africa